The Green Line is a bus rapid transit line of the Karachi Breeze metrobus system, operational since December 2021 in Karachi, Sindh, Pakistan. Its construction began in February 2016 on the orders of the then Prime Minister Nawaz Sharif. Being stalled for years, it was then completed by the orders of Prime Minister Imran Khan. The  busway is the first phase of the Karachi Metrobus network and has 22 stations (a station after every km). The Green Line was expected to be functional by November 2021 and to have a fleet of 80 buses operated by Daewoo. So far, 80 buses for the project have reached from China at the Karachi Port. Speaking at the ceremony held to celebrate the arrival of buses in Karachi, Federal Planning and Development Minister Asad Umar said, "The proper commercial operation of the Green Line bus service would begin in Karachi by 25 December 2021 after completion of the trials". Buses were purchased from Foton Motor.

Route

The route of Green Line is mentioned Below:

Common Corridor Stations (Connected To Other BRTS Lines):

 Tower B Station (Under Construction)
 Tower A Station (Under Construction)
 Light House Station (Under Construction)
 Civil Hospital Station (Under Construction)
 Jama Cloth Station (Under Construction)
 Municipal Park Station (Under Construction)
 Shownu Point Station (Under Construction)
 Gul Plaza Station (Under Construction)
 Sea Breeze Station (Under Construction)
 Numaish Station

Green Line Specific Stations:
Patel Para (Guru Mandir) Station
Lasbela Chowk Station
Sanitary Market (Gulbahar) Station
Nazimabad No.1 Station
Enquiry Office Station
Annu Bhai Park Station
Board Office Station (to Orange Line)
Hyderi Station
Five Star Chowrangi Station
Jummah Bazaar (Bayani Center) Station
Erum Shopping Mall (Shadman No.2) Station
Nagan Chowrangi Station
U.P. More Station
Road 4200 (Saleem Centre) Station
Power House Chowrangi Station
Road 2400 (Aisha Complex) Station
2 Minute Chowrangi Station
Surjani Chowrangi (4K) Station
Karimi Chowrangi Station
KDA Flats Station
Abdullah Chowk Station

Financing and construction
The Government of Pakistan financed the majority of the project. Engineering Associates were contracted as the designers and supervision consultants for Green Line while Think Transportation was contracted as urban engineering consultants.

On 10 December 2021, Prime Minister Imran Khan formally inaugurated the Green Line Bus Rapid Transit project. He announced that "commercial operations will begin on 25 December and total operations will start by 10 January (2022)". Limited operations began from 25 December 2021, with only 11 out of the 22 stations operational (1 station operational per 2 kilometres). The project started its full operations from 10 January 2022, as announced.

A Spanish Firm Grupsa which provided platform screen doors for the Project, approached Pakistani Anti-corruption agencies for over invoicing its services. It claimed that a Pakistani contractor was embezzling funds.

See also
 Karachi Breeze Project
 Karachi Circular Railway
 Transport in Karachi
 Karachi Metrobus
 Orange Line - Karachi Metrobus
 Red Line - Karachi Metrobus

References

Karachi Metrobus
 Transport
Bus rapid transit in Pakistan